Yeonhui-dong may refer to 

Yeonhui-dong, Seoul
Yeonhui-dong, Incheon